Caroline Ithurbide (born 21 July 1979) is a French journalist and television presenter.

Early career
After a double MA in Communication and Foreign Languages, Ithurbide worked as a writer for magazines such as Citizen K, Vogue and Vogue Hommes.

Television 
In March 2005, Ithurbide was invited by Vincent Bolloré and Philippe Labro to join the channel Direct 8.

In 2015, she appeared as a panellist on the series Touche pas à mon poste!

References 

1979 births
Living people
French people of Basque descent
French television presenters
French women television presenters
Journalists from Paris